The 2013 Minnesota Twins season was the 53rd season for the franchise in Minnesota, and the 113th overall in the American League.

The Twins started the 2013 season on April 1, with a game against the Detroit Tigers (losing Opening Day 4-2).  The Twins ended their season with a 5–1 loss against the Cleveland Indians.

The Twins finished their season with a 66–96 record, although they finished 4th in the American League Central standings ahead of the Chicago White Sox, avoiding a last place finish for the first time since 2010.  The team continued to struggle with offense and bullpen rotation, despite the off-season acquisitions of veterans Vance Worley, Mike Pelfrey and Kevin Correia.

Offseason transactions and spring training
January 18, 2013: Agreed to terms with LHP Brian Duensing and C Drew Butera on one-year contracts.
February 14, 2013: Agreed to terms with LHP Rafael Perez on a minor league contract.
March 10, 2013: Reassigned RHP Bryan Augenstein, RHP Nick Blackburn, RHP Alex Meyer, RHP Lester Oliveros and RHP Esmerling Vásquez to their minor league camp.
March 11, 2013: Optioned C Chris Herrmann to Rochester (IL) and RHP B.J. Hermsen, RHP Trevor May, RHP Michael Tonkin, C Josmil Pinto and INF Danny Santana to New Britain (EL).
March 15, 2013: Optioned RHP Kyle Gibson and LHP Caleb Thielbar to Rochester (IL). Reassigned RHP Anthony Slama, C Kyle Knudson and INF James Beresford to their minor league camp.
March 16, 2013: Optioned OF Oswaldo Arcia to Rochester (IL).
March 17, 2013: Reassigned C Eric Fryer, INF Chris Colabello, INF Mark Sobolewski, OF Brian Dinkelman, OF Clete Thomas, RHP Deolis Guerra and RHP Shairon Martis to their minor league camp.
March 23, 2013: Placed LHP Scott Diamond and RHP Anthony Swarzak on the 15-day DL.
March 26, 2013: Reassigned RHP P. J. Walters and RHP Samuel Deduno to minor league camp.
March 27, 2013: Optioned RHP Alex Burnett to Rochester (IL).
March 30, 2013: Placed RHP Tim Wood on the 15-day DL, retroactive March 24. Reassigned RHP Rich Harden and LHP Rafael Perez to their minor league camp.
March 31, 2013: Selected the contract of OF Wilkin Ramírez from Rochester (IL).

The Minnesota Twins finished in fifth place (.515) in the Grapefruit League during spring training with a 17–16 record overall (7–10 home / 10–6 away). They were 4.5 games behind the first place Baltimore Orioles.

Season synopsis
The Twins' batters ended the season with 1430 strikeouts, their most ever, and far exceeding the previous high of 1121 in 1997.  Josh Willingham (128) led the club, with Brian Dozier (120) and Oswaldo Arcia (117) close behind.
Joe Mauer started the All-Star game as the American League catcher. Reliever Glen Perkins was selected as a reserve but did not play.
Mauer won his fifth Silver Slugger Award.

September
Finished 27 games behind the Detroit Tigers.

Season standings

American League Central

American League Wild Card

Record vs. opponents

Detailed records
 updated to game played September 29, 2013

Player stats

Batting
Note: G = Games played; AB = At bats; R = Runs scored; H = Hits; 2B = Doubles; 3B = Triples; HR = Home runs; RBI = Runs batted in; SB = Stolen bases; AVG = Batting average

Pitching
Note: W = Wins; L = Losses; ERA = Earned run average; G = Games pitched; GS = Games started; SV = Saves; IP = Innings pitched; R = Runs allowed; ER = Earned runs allowed; BB = Walks allowed; K = Strikeouts

Game log

|- style="background:#fbb;"
| 1 || April 1 || Tigers || 2–4 || Verlander (1–0) || Worley (0–1) || Coke (1) || 38,282 || 0–1
|- style="background:#bfb;"
| 2 || April 3 || Tigers || 3–2 || Perkins (1–0) || Coke (0–1) || — || 22,963 || 1–1
|- style="background:#bfb;"
| 3 || April 4 || Tigers || 8–2 || Pelfrey (1–0) || Porcello (0–1) || — || 24,752 || 2–1
|- style="background:#fbb;"
| 4 || April 5 || @ Orioles || 5–9 || Ayala (1–0) || Fien (0–1) || — || 46,653 || 2–2
|- style="background:#bfb;"
| 5 || April 6 || @ Orioles || 6–5 || Roenicke (1–0) || Johnson (0–1) || Perkins (1) || 40,704 || 3–2
|- style="background:#bfb;"
| 6 || April 7 || @ Orioles || 4–3 || Swarzak (1–0) || Hammel (1–1) || Perkins (2) || 34,431 || 4–2
|- style="background:#fbb;"
| 7 || April 8 || @ Royals || 1–3 || Santana (1–1) || Correia (0–1) || Crow (1) || 40,073 || 4–3
|- style="background:#fbb;"
| 8 || April 9 || @ Royals || 4–7 || Guthrie (2–0) || Pelfrey (1–1) || Holland (2) || 11,697 || 4–4
|- style="background:#fbb;"
| 9 || April 10 || @ Royals || 0–3 || Davis (1–0) || Hendriks (0–1) || Herrera (2) || 10,069 || 4–5
|- style="background:#fbb;"
| 10 || April 12 || Mets || 5–16 || Niese (2–0) || Worley (0–2) || — || 23,735 || 4–6
|- style="background:#fbb;"
| 11 || April 13 || Mets || 2–4 || Harvey (3–0) || Diamond (0–1) || Parnell (1) || 28,804 || 4–7
|- style="background:#bbb;"
| – || April 14 || Mets ||colspan=6| Postponed (snow). Rescheduled for August 19.
|- style="background:#bfb;"
| 12 || April 15 || Angels || 8–2 || Correia (1–1) || Blanton (0–3) || — || 23,535 || 5–7
|- style="background:#bfb;"
| 13 || April 16 || Angels || 8–6 || Pelfrey (2–1) || Vargas (0–2) || Perkins (3) || 23,299 || 6–7
|- style="background:#bbb;"
| – || April 17 || Angels ||colspan=6| Postponed (rain). Rescheduled for September 9.
|- style="background:#bbb;"
| – || April 19 || @ White Sox ||colspan=6| Postponed (cold, windy conditions). Rescheduled for August 9 as part of a doubleheader.
|- style="background:#bfb;"
| 14 || April 20 || @ White Sox || 2–1 (10) || Fien (1–1) || Santiago (0–1) || Perkins (4) || 22,417 || 7–7
|- style="background:#bfb;"
| 15 || April 21 || @ White Sox || 5–3 || Diamond (1–1) || Lindstrom (1–1) || Perkins (5) || 19,587 || 8–7
|- style="background:#bbb;"
| – || April 22 || Marlins ||colspan=6| Postponed (inclement weather). Rescheduled for April 23 as part of a doubleheader.
|- style="background:#bfb;"
| 16 || April 23 || Marlins || 4–3 || Correia (2–1) || Fernández (0–2) || Perkins (6) || 25,716 || 9–7
|- style="background:#fbb;"
| 17 || April 23 || Marlins || 5–8 || Nolasco (1–2) || Pelfrey (2–2) || Cishek (2) || 23,300 || 9–8
|- style="background:#fbb;"
| 18 || April 25 || Rangers || 1–2 || Tepesch (2–1) || Worley (0–3) || Nathan (7) || 25,459 || 9–9
|- style="background:#fbb;"
| 19 || April 26 || Rangers || 3–4 || Grimm (2–0) || Diamond (1–2) || Nathan (8)
|| 27,404 || 9–10
|- style="background:#bfb;"
| 20 || April 27 || Rangers || 7–2 || Hernández (1–0) || Holland (1–2) || — || 37,503 || 10–10
|- style="background:#bfb;"
| 21 || April 28 || Rangers || 5–0 || Correia (3–1) || Ogando (2–2) || — || 35,751 || 11–10
|- style="background:#fbb;"
| 22 || April 29 || @ Tigers || 3–4 || Scherzer (3–0) || Pelfrey (2–3) || Benoit (2) || 29,878 || 11–11
|- style="background:#fbb;"
| 23 || April 30 || @ Tigers || 1–6 || Verlander (3–2) || Worley (0–4) || — || 31,748 || 11–12
|-

|- style="background:#bfb;"
| 24 || May 1 || @ Tigers || 6–2 || Diamond (2–2) || Sánchez (3–2) || — || 36,028 || 12–12
|- style="background:#fbb;"
| 25 || May 3 || @ Indians || 6–7 (10) || Perez (1–0) || Fien (1–2) || — || 20,200 || 12–13
|- style="background:#fbb;"
| 26 || May 4 || @ Indians || 3–7 || Kazmir (1–1) || Correia (3–2) || — || 17,830 || 12–14
|- style="background:#bfb;"
| 27 || May 5 || @ Indians || 4–2 || Pelfrey (3–3) || Kluber (2–1) || Perkins (7) || 14,015 || 13–14
|- style="background:#fbb;"
| 28 || May 6 || @ Red Sox || 6–5 (11) || Mortensen (1–2) || Burton (0–1) || — || 31,088 || 13–15
|- style="background:#bfb;"
| 29 || May 7 || @ Red Sox || 6–1 || Diamond (3–2) || Dempster (2–3) || — || 30,549 || 14–15
|- style="background:#bfb;"
| 30 || May 8 || @ Red Sox || 15–8 || Pressly (1–0) || Webster (0–1) || — || 29,969 || 15–15
|- style="background:#bfb;"
| 31 || May 9 || @ Red Sox || 5–3 || Correia (4–2) || Lackey (1–3) || Perkins (8) || 31,571 || 16–15
|- style="background:#fbb;"
| 32 || May 10 || Orioles || 6–9 (10) || Hunter (3–1) || Swarzak (1–1) || J. Johnson (14) || 31,360 || 16–16
|- style="background:#bfb;"
| 33 || May 11 || Orioles || 8–5 || Worley (1–4) || S. Johnson (0–1) || Burton (1) || 32,221 || 17–16
|- style="background:#fbb;"
| 34 || May 12 || Orioles || 0–6 || Chen (3–3) || Diamond (3–3) || — || 34,320 || 17–17
|- style="background:#bfb;"
| 35 || May 13 || White Sox || 10–3 || Hernández (2–0) || Santiago (1–2) || — || 25,605 || 18–17
|- style="background:#fbb;"
| 36 || May 14 || White Sox || 4–2 || Peavy (5–1) || Correia (4–3) || Reed (12) || 32,023 || 18–18
|- style="background:#fbb;"
| 37 || May 15 || White Sox || 9–4 || Axelrod (1–3) || Pelfrey (3–4) || — || 35,613 || 18–19
|- style="background:#fbb;"
| 38 || May 17 || Red Sox || 2–3 (10) || Wilson (1–0) || Roenicke (1–1) || Uehara (1) || 30,210 || 18–20
|- style="background:#fbb;"
| 39 || May 18 || Red Sox || 5–12 || Breslow (1–0) || Diamond (3–4) || — || 36,967 || 18–21
|- style="background:#fbb;"
| 40 || May 19 || Red Sox || 1–5 || Lackey (2–4) || Hernández (2–1) || — || 33,042 || 18–22
|- style="background:#fbb;"
| 41 || May 20 || @ Braves || 1–5 || Teherán (3–1) || Correia (4–4) || Gearrin (1) || 20,173 || 18–23
|- style="background:#fbb;"
| 42 || May 21 || @ Braves || 4–5 (10) || Kimbrel (1–1) || Duensing (0–1) || — || 28,663 || 18–24
|- style="background:#fbb;"
| 43 || May 22 || @ Braves || 3–8 || Maholm (6–4) || Worley (1–5) || — || 27,798 || 18–25
|- style="background:#fbb;"
| 44 || May 23 || @ Tigers || 6–7 || Benoit (1–0) || Burton (0–2) || Valverde (5) || 32,804 || 18–26
|- style="background:#fbb;"
| 45 || May 24 || @ Tigers || 0–6 || Sánchez (5–4) || Deduno (0–1) || — || 39,789 || 18–27
|- style="background:#bfb;"
| 46 || May 25 || @ Tigers || 3–2 || Walters (1–0) || Fister (5–2) || Perkins (9) || 41,927 || 19–27
|- style="background:#fbb;"
| 47 || May 26 || @ Tigers || 1–6 || Scherzer (7–0) || Pelfrey (3–5) || — || 42,394 || 19–28
|- style="background:#bfb;"
| 48 || May 27 || @ Brewers || 6–3 || Correia (5–4) || Peralta (3–6) || Perkins (10) || 38,627 || 20–28
|- style="background:#bfb;"
| 49 || May 28 || @ Brewers || 6–5 (14) || Pressly (2–0) || Badenhop (0–2) || Duensing (1) || 24,415 || 21–28
|- style="background:#bfb;"
| 50 || May 29 || Brewers || 4–1 || Deduno (1–1) || Estrada (4–3) || Perkins (11) || 31,359 || 22–28
|- style="background:#bfb;"
| 51 || May 30 || Brewers || 8–6 || Walters (2–0) || Loshe (1–6) || Burton (2) || 32,688 || 23–28
|- style="background:#fbb;"
| 52 || May 31 || Mariners || 0–3 || Iwakuma (6–1) || Pelfrey (3–6) || Wilhelmsen (12) || 31,430 || 23–29
|-

|- style="background:#bfb;"
| 53 || June 1 || Mariners || 5–4 || Thielbar (1–0) || Wilhelmsen (0–1) || — || 33,417 || 24–29
|- style="background:#bfb;"
| 54 || June 2 || Mariners || 10–0 || Diamond (4–4) || Bonderman (0–1) || — || 34,876 || 25–29
|- style="background:#bfb;"
| 55 || June 4 || @ Royals || 3–0 || Deduno (2–1) || Mendoza (1–3) || Perkins (12) || 20,134 || 26–29
|- style="background:#fbb;"
| 56 || June 5 || @ Royals || 1–4 || Guthrie (6–3) || Walters (2–1) || Holland (10) || 12,407 || 26–30  
|- style="background:#fbb;"
| 57 || June 6 || @ Royals || 3–7 || Collins (2–1) || Burton (0–3) || — || 14,942 || 26–31
|- style="background:#bbb;"
|    || June 7 || @ Nationals ||colspan=6| Postponed (rain). Doubleheader June 9.
|- style="background:#bfb;"
| 58 || June 8 || @ Nationals || 4–3 (11) || Roenicke (2–1) || Stammen (3–2) || Perkins (13) || 41,587 || 27–31
|- style="background:#fbb;"
| 59 || June 9 || @ Nationals || 0–7 || Zimmermann (9–3) || Diamond (4–5) || — || 38,516 || 27–32
|- style="background:#fbb;"
| 60 || June 9 || @ Nationals || 4–5 || Clippard (5–1) || Swarzak (1–2) || Soriano (16) || 27,949 || 27–33
|- style="background:#bfb;"
| 61 || June 11|| Phillies || 3–2 || Duensing (1–1) || Adams (1–4) || Perkins (14) || 30,104 || 28–33
|- style="background:#bfb;"
| 62 || June 12 || Phillies || 4–3 || Duensing (2–1) || Bastardo (2–2)|| Perkins (15) || 28,910 || 29–33
|- style="background:#fbb;"
| 63 || June 13 || Phillies || 2–3 || Cliff Lee (8–2) || Burton (0–4) || Papelbon (12) || 28,519 || 29–34
|- style="background:#fbb;"
| 64 || June 14 || Tigers || 0–4 || Porcello (4–3) || Diamond (4–6) || — || 29,571 || 29–35
|- style="background:#bfb;"
| 65 || June 15 || Tigers || 6–3 || Deduno (3–1) || Downs (0–2) || Perkins (16) || 35,017 || 30–35
|- style="background:#fbb;"
| 66 || June 16 || Tigers || 2–5 || Fister (6–4) || Walters (2–2) || Benoit (4) || 39,317 || 30–36
|- style="background:#bfb;"
| 67 || June 18 || White Sox || 7–5 || Burton (1–4) || Troncoso (0–2) || Perkins (17) || 30,387 || 31–36
|- style="background:#bfb;"
| 68 || June 19 || White Sox || 7–4 || Correia (6–4) || Sale (5–6) || Perkins (18) || 30,003 || 32–36
|- style="background:#bfb;"
| 69 || June 20 || White Sox || 8–4 || Diamond (5–6)  || Danks (1–4) || — || 35,837 || 33–36
|- style="background:#fbb;"
| 70 || June 21 || @ Indians || 1–5 || Kazmir (4–4) || Deduno (3–2) || — || 26,442 || 33–37
|- style="background:#fbb;"
| 71 || June 22 || @ Indians || 7–8 || Kluber (6–4) || Walters (3–2) || Pestano (3) || 21,417 || 33–38
|- style="background:#bfb;"
| 72 || June 23 || @ Indians || 5–3 || Hernández (3–1) || Carrasco (0–3) || Perkins (19) || 17,143 || 34–38
|- style="background:#fbb;"
| 73 || June 25 || @ Marlins || 2–4 || Ramos (2–2) || Correia (6–5) || Cishek (13) || 14,581 || 34–39
|- style="background:#fbb;"
| 74 || June 26 || @ Marlins || 3–5 || Slowey (3–6) || Diamond (5–7) || Cishek (14) || 15,318 || 34–40
|- style="background:#bfb;"
| 75 || June 27 || Royals || 3–1 || Deduno (4–2) || Guthrie (7–6) || Perkins (19) || 28,040 || 35–40
|- style="background:#fbb;"
| 76 || June 28 || Royals || 3–9 || Shields (3–6) || Walters (2–4) || — || 28,916 || 35–41
|- style="background:#bfb;"
| 77 || June 29 || Royals || 6–2 || Gibson (1–0) || Davis (4–6) || — || 36,881 || 36–41
|- style="background:#fbb;"
| 78 || June 30 || Royals || 8–9 || Crow (5–3) || Burton (1–5) || Holland (17) || 34,232 || 36–42
|-

|- style="background:#ffbbbb"
| 82 || July 1 || Yankees || 4–10 || Chamberlain (1–0) || Burton (1–6) || — || 29,619 || 36–43 
|- style="background:#ffbbbb"
| 83 || July 2 || Yankees || 3–7 || Hughes (4–7) || Deduno (4–3) || Rivera (27) || 29,029 || 36–44
|- style="background:#fbb"
| 81 || July 3 || Yankees || 2–3 || Sabathia (9–6) || Walters (2–5) || Rivera (28) || 38,457 || 36–45
|- style="background:#fbb"
| 82 || July 4 || Yankees || 5–9 || Phelps (6–5) || Gibson (1–1) || — || 38,260 || 36–46  
|- style="background:#fbb"
| 83 || July 5 || @ Blue Jays || 0–4 || Buehrle (5–5) || Correia (6–6) || — || 25,672 || 36–47  
|- style="background:#bfb;"
| 84 || July 6 || @ Blue Jays || 6–0 || Pelfrey (4–6) || Dickey (8–9) || — || 37,034 || 37–47  
|- style="background:#fbb"
| 85 || July 7 || @ Blue Jays || 5–11 || Redmond (1–1) || Diamond (5–8) || — || 43,795 || 37–48 
|- style="background:#fbb"
| 86 || July 8 || @ Rays || 4–7 || Torres (3–0) || Deduno (4–4) || Rodney (20) || 11,516 || 37–49  
|- style="background:#fbb"
| 87 || July 9 || @ Rays || 1–4 || Archer (3–3) || Gibson (1–2) || Rodney (21) || 12,777 || 37–50 
|- style="background:#fbb"
| 88 || July 10 || @ Rays || 3–4 (13) || Ramos (2–2) || Pressly (2–1) || — || 12,757 || 37–51  
|- style="background:#fbb"
| 89 || July 11 || @ Rays || 3–4 || Moore (13–3) || Pelfrey (4–7) || McGee (1) || 24,751 || 37–52 
|- style="background:#fbb"
| 90 || July 12 || @ Yankees || 0–2 || Kuroda (8–6) || Pressly (2–2) || Rivera (30) || 40,247 || 37–53 
|- style="background:#bfb;"
| 91 || July 13 || @ Yankees || 4–1 ||  Deduno (5–4) || Hughes (4–9) || Perkins (21) || 40,301 || 38–53 
|- style="background:#bfb;"
| 92 || July 14 || @ Yankees || 10–4 || Gibson (2–2) || Sabathia (9–8) || — || 43,131 || 39–53 
|- style="background:#bfb;"
| 93 || July 19 || Indians || 3–2 || Fien (2–2) || Smith (4–1) || Perkins (22) || 36,280 || 40–53   
|- style="background:#bfb;"
| 94 || July 20 || Indians || 3–2 || Correia (7–6) || Hill (1–2) || Perkins (23) || 38,626 || 41–53 
|- style="background:#fbb;"
| 95 || July 21 || Indians || 1–7 || Masterson (11–7) || Diamond (5–9) || — || 31,753 || 41–54  
|- style="background:#bfb;"
| 96 || July 22 || @ Angels || 4–3 || Deduno (6–4) || Blanton (2–13) || Perkins (24) || 33,363 || 42–54 
|- style="background:#bfb;"
| 97 || July 23 || @ Angels || 10–3 (10) || Perkins (2–0) || Frieri (0–2) || — || 39,177 || 43–54   
|- style="background:#fbb;"
| 98 || July 24 || @ Angels || 0–1 || Weaver (5–5) || Pelfrey (4–8) || Frieri (25) || 38,209 || 43–55  
|- style="background:#fbb;"
| 99 || July 25 || @ Mariners || 2–8 || Iwakuma (10–4) || Correia (7–7) || — || 18,135 || 43–56
|- style="background:#bfb;"
| 100 || July 26 || @ Mariners || 3–2 || Duensing (3–1) || Medina (3–3) || Perkins (25) || 23,162 || 44–56  
|- style="background:#bfb;"
| 101 || July 27 || @ Mariners || 4–0 || Deduno (7–4) || Harang (5–9) || — || 24,524 || 45–56  
|- style="background:#fbb;"
| 102 || July 28 || @ Mariners || 4–6 || Ramírez (2–0) || Gibson (2–3) || Wilhelmsen (24) || 35,087 || 45–57  
|- style="background:#fbb;"
| 103 || July 30 || Royals || 2–7 || Santana (7–6) || Pelfrey (4–9) || — || 33,085 || 45–58  
|- style="background:#fbb;"
| 104 || July 31 || Royals || 3–4 || Gutherie (11–7) || Thielbar (1–1) || Holland (28) || 32,789 || 45–59
|-

|- style="background:#fbb;"
| 105 || August 1 || Royals || 2–7 || Shields (6–7) || Diamond (5–10) || — || 35,448 || 45–60 
|- style="background:#bfb;"
| 106 || August 2 || Astros || 4–3 || Pressly (3–2) || Keuchel (5–6) || — || 30,633 || 46–60
|- style="background:#bfb;"
| 107 || August 3 || Astros || 6–4 || Duensing (4–1) || Harrell (5–12)   || Perkins (26) || 38,078 || 47–60 
|- style="background:#bfb;"
| 108 || August 4 || Astros || 3–2 || Thielbar (2–1) || Peacock (1–4) || Perkins (27) || 34,780 || 48–60   
|- style="background:#fbb;"
| 109 || August 5 || @ Royals || 0–13 || Guthrie (12–7) ||  Correia (7–8) || — || 21,474 || 48–61  
|- style="background:#bfb;"
| 110 || August 6 || @ Royals || 7–0 || Albers (1–0) || Shields (6–8) || — || 18,924 || 49–61 
|- style="background:#fbb;"
| 111 || August 7 || @ Royals || 2–5 || Coleman (2–0) || Deduno (7–5) || Holland (30) || 20,198 || 49–62  
|- style="background:#bfb;"
| 112 || August 9 || @ White Sox || 7–5 || Duensing (5–1) || Veal (1–3) || — || 17,439 || 50–62   
|- style="background:#bfb;"
| 113 || August 9 || @ White Sox || 3–2 (10) || Duensing (6–1) || Axelrod (4–9) || Perkins (28) || 23,804 || 51–62 
|- style="background:#fbb;"
| 114 || August 10 || @ White Sox || 4–5 || Purcey (1–1) || Pelfrey (4–10) || Reed (28) || 24,529 || 51–63 
|- style="background:#bfb;"
| 115 || August 11 || @ White Sox || 5–2 || Correia (8–8) || Quintana (6–4) || — || 26,344 || 52–63  
|- style="background:#bfb;"
| 116 || August 12 || Indians || 3–0 || Albers (2–0) || Salazar (1–1) || — || 30,922 || 53–63 
|- style="background:#fbb;"
| 117 || August 13 || Indians || 2–5 || McAllister (5–7) || Deduno (7–6) || Perez (19) || 29,806 || 53–64
|- style="background:#fbb;"
| 118 || August 14 || Indians || 8–9 (12) || Perez (5–2) || Pressly (3–3) || Smith (2) || 35,133 || 53–65
|- style="background:#bfb;"
| 119 || August 15 || White Sox || 4–3 || Burton (2–6) || Troncoso (1–4) || — || 32,851 || 54–65 
|- style="background:#fbb;"
| 120 || August 16 || White Sox || 2–5 || Quintana (7–4) || Correia (8–9) || Reed (29) || 28,834 || 54–66
|- style="background:#fbb;"
| 121 || August 17 || White Sox || 5–8 || Sale (9–11) || Albers (2–1) || Reed (30) || 36,833 || 54–67 
|- style="background:#fbb;"
| 122 || August 18 || White Sox || 2–5    || Santiago (4–7) || Deduno (7–7) || Reed (31) || 32,905 || 54–68 
|- style="background:#fbb;"
| 123 || August 19 || Mets || 1–6 || Gee (9–8) || Gibson (2–4) || — || 30,913 || 54–69
|- style="background:#bfb;"
| 124 || August 20 || @ Tigers || 6–3 || Pelfrey (5–10) || Porcello (9–7) || Perkins (29) || 37,964 || 55–69
|- style="background:#fbb;"
| 125 || August 21 || @ Tigers || 1–7 || Smyly (5–0) || Correia (8–10) || Veras (20) || 38,092 || 55–70
|- style="background:#bfb;"
| 126 || August 22 || @ Tigers || 7–6 || Fien (3–2) || Rondon (1–2) || Perkins (30) || 39,653 || 56–70 
|- style="background:#bfb;"
| 127 || August 23 || @ Indians || 5–1 || Deduno (8–7) || Jiménez (9–8) || — || 23,218 || 57–70 
|- style="background:#fbb;"
| 128 || August 24 || @ Indians || 2–7 || McAllister (7–7) || Hendriks (0–2)  || — || 23,218 || 57–71  
|- style="background:#fbb;"
| 129 || August 25 || @ Indians || 1–3 || Smith (5–1) || Burton (2–7) || Perez (21) || 21,042 || 57–72 
|- style="background:#fbb;"
| 130 || August 27 || Royals || 1–6 || Shields (9–8) || Burton (2–8)  || — || 27,006 || 57–73
|- style="background:#fbb;"
| 131 || August 28 || Royals || 1–8 || Duffy (2–0) || Albers (2–2)  || — || 27,379 || 57–74 
|- style="background:#fbb;"
| 132 || August 29 || Royals || 1–3 || Chen (6–2) || Deduno (8–8) || Holland (36) || 28,012 || 57–75 
|- style="background:#bfb;"
| 133 || August 30 || @ Rangers || 3–2 || Hendriks (1–2) || Darvish (12–6) || Perkins (31) ||  34,815 || 58–75 
|- style="background:#fbb;"
| 134 || August 31 || @ Rangers || 1–2 || Nathan (5–2) || Thielbar (2–2) || — || 36,041 || 58–76
|-

|- style="background:#bfb;"
| 135 || September 1 || @ Rangers || 4–2 || Correia (9–10) || Blackley (2–2) || Perkins (31) || 36,549 || 59–76  
|- style="background:#bfb;"
| 136 || September 2 || @ Astros || 10–6 || Roenicke (3–1) || Lo (0–3) || — || 14,287 || 60–76  
|- style="background:#bfb;"
| 137 || September 3 || @ Astros || 9–6 || Thielbar (3–2) || Chapman (0–1) || — || 13,500 || 61–76 
|- style="background:#fbb;"
| 138 || September 4 || @ Astros || 5–6 || Bédard (4–10) || Duensing (6–2) || — || 14,869 || 61–77
|- style="background:#fbb;"
| 139 || September 6 || Blue Jays || 5–6 || Dickey (12–12) || Pelfrey (5–11) || Janssen (28) || 27,044 || 61–78
|- style="background:#fbb;"
| 140 || September 7 || Blue Jays || 2–11 || Happ (4–5) || Correia (9–11)  || — || 32,882 || 61–79
|- style="background:#fbb;"
| 141 || September 8 || Blue Jays || 0–2 || Rogers (5–7) || Burton (2–9) || Janssen (29) || 29,450 || 61–80
|- style="background:#bfb;"
| 142 || September 9 || Angels || 6–3 || Fien (4–2) || Rasmus (0–1) || Perkins (33) || 21,826 || 62–80
|- style="background:#bfb;"
| 143 || September 10 || Athletics || 4–3 || Swarzak (2–2) || Cook (6–4) || Perkins (34) || 26,017 || 63–80
|- style="background:#fbb;"
| 144 || September 11 || Athletics || 3–18 || Gray (3–3) || Pelfrey (5–12) || — || 24,522 || 63–81 
|- style="background:#fbb;"
| 145 || September 12 || Athletics || 2–8 || Griffin (14–9) || Diamond (5–11) || — || 26,188 || 63–82
|- style="background:#fbb;"
| 146 || September 13 || Rays || 0–3 || Archer (9–7) || Correia (9–12) || Rodney (35) || 27,292 || 63–83 
|- style="background:#fbb;"
| 147 || September 14 || Rays || 0–7 || Gomes (1–1) || Albers (2–3) || — || 28,541 || 63–84 
|- style="background:#bfb;"
| 148 || September 15 || Rays || 6–4 || Fien (5–2) || Peralta (2–8) || Perkins (35) || 27,988 || 64–84 
|- style="background:#fbb;"
| 149 || September 16 || @ White Sox ||1–12 || Johnson (1–2) || Hendriks (1–3) || — || 15,018 || 64–85 
|- style="background:#fbb;"
| 150 || September 17 || @ White Sox ||  3–4    || Quintana (8–6) || Pelfrey (5–13) || Reed (38) || 15,964 || 64–86  
|- style="background:#bfb;"
| 151 || September 18 || @ White Sox || 4–3 || Diamond (6–11) || Danks (4–14) || Perkins (36) || 14,520 || 65–86  
|- style="background:#fbb;"
| 152 || September 19 || @ Athletics ||   6–8   || Doolittle (5–5) || Martis (0–1) || — || 11,461 || 65–87  
|- style="background:#fbb;"
| 153 || September 20 || @ Athletics || 0–11 || Colón (17–6) || Albers (2–4) || — || 36,067 || 65–88  
|- style="background:#fbb;"
| 154 || September 21 || @ Athletics || 1–9 || Parker (12–7) || Hernández (3–2) || — || 26,393 || 65–89 
|- style="background:#fbb;"
| 155 || September 22 || @ Athletics || 7–11 || Gray (4–3) || De Vries (0–1) || — || 30,589 || 65–90 
|- style="background:#bfb;"
| 156 || September 23 || Tigers || 4–3 || Swarzak (2–2) || Putkonen (1–2) || — ||  24,647 || 66–90
|- style="background:#fbb;"
| 157 || September 24 || Tigers || 2–4 || Fister (14–9) || Diamond (6–12) || Benoit (23) || 25,541 || 66–91 
|- style="background:#fbb;"
| 158 || September 25 || Tigers || 1–0 || Scherzer (21–3) || Correia (9–13) || Benoit (24) || 26,517 || 66–92 
|- style="background:#fbb;"
| 159 || September 26 || Indians || 5–6 || Shaw (7–3) || Albers (2–5) || Smith (3) || 24,929 || 66–93 
|- style="background:#fbb;"
| 160 || September 27 || Indians || 6–12 || Kluber (11–5) || Hernández (3–3) || — || 24,074 || 66–94
|- style="background:#fbb;"
| 161 || September 28 || Indians || 1–5 || Kazmir (10–9) || De Vries (0–2) || — || 30,452 || 66–95
|- style="background:#fbb;"
| 162 || September 29 || Indians || 1–5 || Jiménez (13–9) || Diamond (6–13) || — || 30,935 || 66–96
|-

Roster

Other post-season awards
Calvin R. Griffith Award (Most Valuable Twin) – Joe Mauer
Joseph W. Haynes Award (Twins Pitcher of the Year) – Glen Perkins
Bill Boni Award (Twins Outstanding Rookie) – Caleb Thielbar
Charles O. Johnson Award (Most Improved Twin) – Brian Dozier
Jim Kaat Award (Defensive Player of the Year) – Pedro Florimón
Dick Siebert Award (Upper Midwest Player of the Year) – Jordan Zimmermann
Bob Allison Award (Leadership Award) – Justin Morneau
Mike Augustin Award ("Media Good Guy" Award) – Brian Dozier
The above awards are voted on by the Twin Cities chapter of the BBWAA
Carl R. Pohlad Award (Outstanding Community Service) – Glen Perkins
Sherry Robertson Award (Twins Outstanding Farm System Position Player) – Byron Buxton
Jim Rantz Award (Twins Outstanding Farm System Pitcher) – Andrew Albers
Kirby Puckett Award (Alumni Community Service) – Frank Quilici
Herb Carneal Award (Lifetime Achievement Award) – Tony Oliva

Farm system

References

External links
2013 Minnesota Twins at Baseball Reference

2013 

Minnesota Twins seasons
Minnesota Twins
2013 in sports in Minnesota